Gunnar Alexander Huseby (4 November 1923 – 28 May 1995) was an Icelandic track and field athlete who competed in the shot put and discus throw events. He won consecutive gold medals at the European Athletics Championships in 1946 and 1950, becoming Iceland's first European champion in athletics. This placed him among the country's first top international sportsmen, following its independence in 1944. He remains the only Icelandic athlete to win two European athletics titles.

He won eighteen Icelandic national titles in total: ten in shot put, six in discus throw and two in hammer throw.

Despite his national success, he also caused controversy in Iceland due to his alcoholism and a physical assault, for which he served a jail sentence. As a result, he was banned from competition for a period by the national governing body.

Career

Early life
Born in Reykjavik, he competed in various athletics events as a youth. Gradually he began to focus on throwing events as he grew older.

European gold medals
Huseby's first international medal came at the 1946 European Athletics Championships – the first after the end of World War II. This made him Iceland's first ever European champion in athletics. His win at the championships was significant for the country as it was Iceland's first top level international sporting success since its independence in 1944.

He missed the 1948 season, meaning he did not compete London Olympics, but returned in strong form in 1949.

Huseby was a large distance ahead of runner-up Angiolo Profeti, who managed a little over fifteen metres.

Torfi Bryngeirsson won the men's long jump at the same tournament, making this Iceland's best ever European performance in the sport. Huseby's shot put title defence made him the most successful international Icelandic ever – no other athlete from the nation has won a European title since. He also managed to place eleventh in the discus qualifying. Huseby set a lifetime best for the discus that year, throwing the implement  to rank within the world's top twenty for that event.

He was invited to the AAA Championships in England and was victorious with a throw of  – the furthest distance ever thrown at the competition at that point.

Later career
He developed alcoholism during this period and his approach to training and competition earned him a warning from Frjálsíþróttasamband Íslands (the national body for athletics) and an order that further bad conduct would warrant an international ban. In 1952 he confessed to assault and robbery of a man in Reykjavik and was sentenced to twelve months in prison. This meant he missed his second opportunity to compete at the Olympics, which was held in Helsinki that year.

Upon his release, he set an Icelandic indoor record, but the governing body had disagreements with him returning to the national championships – a fact which attracted criticism in the press, given Huseby's standing as one of the nation's top sportsmen. Eventually he was given his competition license and went on to represent Iceland at the 1958 European Athletics Championships.

Huseby took his final Icelandic national title in 1962. This brought him to career totals of ten shot put titles, six discus throw titles and two hammer throw titles at the national championships. He reconciled with the governors of Frjálsíþróttasamband Íslands and an honorary retirement meeting was held in recognition of Huseby's 25-year athletics career.

See also
List of European Athletics Championships medalists (men)

References

1923 births
1995 deaths
Gunnar Huseby
Gunnar Huseby
European Athletics Championships medalists
Gunnar Huseby
Gunnar Huseby
Gunnar Huseby
Gunnar Huseby